Khandakar Abdur Rashid, better known as Abdur Rashid Tarkabagish (27 November 1900 – 20 August 1986) was a Bangladeshi politician and Islamic scholar. His career spans from the anti-colonial independence movement to the establishment of both Pakistan and Bangladesh. Tarkabagish was the second president of the All Pakistan Awami Muslim League, and served as a member of the National Assembly of Pakistan and later the Parliament of Bangladesh. Despite being a member of the treasury bench, he opposed what he considered to be the repressive mentality of the Nurul Amin government towards the Bengali Language Movement.

Early life and education
Khandakar Abdur Rashid was born on 27 November 1900 to a scholarly Bengali Muslim family of Khandakars in the village of Tarutia situated in Ullahpara, Sirajganj (then under the Pabna District of the Bengal Presidency). His father, Khandakar Abu Ishaq, traces his lineage to Shah Syed Darwish Mahmud, a Muslim preacher descended from Abdul Qadir Gilani, who had arrived in the region from Baghdad in 1303.

From an early age, he developed a sense of patriotism. At the age of thirteen, he assembled helpless milk sellers against the local zamindars and mahajans and demanded that they pay them a fair price for milk. By the age of twenty-one, he was leading marchers in a non-violent protest for independence at the Salanga bazaar in Raiganj, when the crowd was fired upon, killing hundreds of people. The events of 27 January 1922 are now referred to as the Salanga massacre in Bangladesh, and memorialised by "Salanga Day" annually.

He later decided to pursue higher Islamic studies, and thus entered the United Provinces and Lahore, where was educated in Deobandi institutions such as Darul Uloom Deoband and Mazahir Uloom. He received his degree in logic and reasoning (tarka) and was honoured with the title of Tarkabagish (master of reasoning).

Political career
Tarkabagish joined the Muslim League in 1936. From the party he participated in the election and earned his place in the Bengal Legislative Assembly in 1937 and in 1946. At the budget session of the East Bengal Legislative Assembly on the 21st of February 1952, Tarkabagish heavily criticized the killing of several protesters near Dhaka Medical College.

Tarkabagish asked the leader of the house, Nurul Amin, to formulate an inquiry and to visit to the wounded students before proceeding the session. But as Amin refused the proposal, he walked out of the assembly and subsequently retired from Muslim League Parliamentary Party on February 23, 1952. He also expressed gratitude to the dead and wounded activists of the movement.

Tarkabagish protested the police firing on and killing of students on 21 February 1952, in the assembly. He also made his speech in Bengali to respect his mother tongue and martyrs of the language movement. He was arrested on February 23 and kept in jail until June 1. Then he joined Awami Muslim League (now the Awami League) and was again elected a member of the assembly in 1954 from United Front. He was also elected as the member of the Constituent Assembly of Pakistan in 1956.

Tarkabagish was elected as the acting president of the Awami League in 1957, and then the president of the Awami League from 1964, a position in which he served till 1967.

After the independence of Bangladesh
Tarkabagish presided over at the first session of the Jatiya Sangsad of Bangladesh in 1972. He was again elected a member from Awami League in 1973. After the assassinations of the founding father and then-President of Bangladesh, and almost his entire family and several relatives on August 15, 1975, by a group of military officers in an attempted coup, and subsequent coups and countercoups, Tarkabagish himself formed a party named Gano Azadi League in 1976. During the regime of Ershad he played a role in the formation and activities of 15 party alliance that took part in the movement against Ershad.
 He played an important role as one of the leaders of the alliance in the movement against military rule of Hussein Mohammad Ershad.He was all along uncompromising towards fundamentalism and sectarianism. Maulana Abdur Rashid Tarkabagish was honoured with the Independence Day Award (posthumously) by the Government of Bangladesh in 2000 AD.

Death and legacy
Tarkabagish died in Dhaka on 20 August 1986. He was honored with an Independence Day Award in 2000.

Controversy 
After the assassination of Mujibur Rahman, Tarkabagish went against his former comrade and praised the mastermind of the assassination Khondaker Mostaq Ahmad saying, "May Allah bless the President [Moshtaque] in establishing rule of law, peace and happiness in the country by uprooting corruption."

References

Citations
  

1900 births
1986 deaths
Awami League politicians
Recipients of the Independence Day Award
Pakistan Muslim League politicians
Presidents of the Awami League
1st Jatiya Sangsad members
Pakistani MNAs 1955–1958
20th-century Bengalis
People from Sirajganj District
Bangladeshi people of Arab descent
Darul Uloom Deoband alumni
Mazahir Uloom alumni
Bangladeshi Sunni Muslim scholars of Islam
Bengali Muslim scholars of Islam
Bengal MLAs 1937–1945